João Bosco Quevado da Silva (8 March 1937 – 27 May 2013) was a Macau-born Hong Kong field hockey player. He competed in the men's tournament at the 1964 Summer Olympics.

da Silva attended school at Pedro Nolasco Commercial School and emigrated to Hong Kong in 1956, where he worked for HSBC before turning his hobby for hockey into a full-time job.

References

External links
 

1937 births
2013 deaths
Macanese people
Macau emigrants to Hong Kong
Hong Kong male field hockey players
Olympic field hockey players of Hong Kong
Field hockey players at the 1964 Summer Olympics
Hong Kong people of Macanese descent
Hong Kong emigrants to Brazil